Minamoto No Yoshiie (源 義家; 1039 – 4 August 1106), also known as Hachimantarō, was a Minamoto clan samurai of the late Heian period, and Chinjufu-shōgun (Commander-in-chief of the defense of the North).

The first son of Minamoto no Yoriyoshi, he proved himself in battle with the Abe clan in the Zenkunen War (Former Nine Years' War) and the Kiyohara clan in the Gosannen War (Later Three Years' War). Subsequently, he became something of a paragon of samurai skill and bravery.

The Zenkunen War

In 1050, Abe no Yoritoki wave the post of Chinjufu-shōgun, as the Abe clan had for many generations. Effectively, however, Yoritoki commanded the entire region, denying the official Governor any true power. As a result, Yoshiie's father was appointed both chinjufu shōgun and governor, and Yoshiie traveled north with him to resolve the situation.

The campaign against the Abe clan lasted twelve years. Yoshiie fought alongside his father in almost every battle, including the Battle of Kawasaki and the Siege of Kuriyagawa. Abe no Yoritoki died in 1057, but his son Abe no Sadato took up command of his father's forces. But in 1062, Yoshiie defeated and kill Sadato, winning the war a year later.

Yoshiie returned to Kyoto in early 1063 with the heads of Abe no Sadato and a number of others.

As a result of his dramatic prowess in battle, he earned the name Hachiman taro, referring to him as the "son of Hachiman", the god of war. The following year, Yoshiie took several followers of the Abe, who he had taken as captives, as attendants.

The Later Three Years' War

Over twenty years later, Yoshiie was the chief commander in another important conflict of the Heian period. Beginning in 1083, he battled the Kiyohara family, who had fought alongside him and his father against the Abe, but who had since proven themselves poor rulers of the northern provinces.

Named Governor of Mutsu province in 1083, Yoshiie took it upon himself, without orders from the Imperial Court, to bring some peace and order to the region. A series of disputes between Kiyohara no Masahira, Kiyohara no Narihira, and Kiyohara no Iehira over leadership of the clan had turned to violence.

There emerged a series of battles and skirmishes between Yoshiie's forces and those of the various Kiyohara sub-factions. Everything came to a head in 1087, at the Kanazawa stockade. Yoshiie, along with his younger brother, Minamoto no Yoshimitsu, assaulted the position held by Kiyohara no Iehira and his uncle Kiyohara no Takahira. After many months of failed starts and skirmishes, the stockade was set aflame, and both Takahira and Iehira were killed. The Minamoto forces suffered great losses as well. But it is said that Yoshiie was an especially skilled leader, keeping morale up and preserving a degree of discipline among the warriors.

Later life
In 1108, Yoshiie disapproved the government and started a revolt which was put down in by Taira general Masamori, father of Taira no Tadamori. That same year he died. Despite his early death, Yoshiie was remembered by many as a skilled warrior and a respected leader. He was revered as a patron saint of the warrior class and was celebrated in Japanese literature and folklore for centuries after his death.

Family
 Father: Minamoto no Yoriyoshi (源頼義, 988–1075)
 Mother: Daughter of Taira no Naokata (平直方の娘)
 Wife: Daughter of Fujiwara no Aritsuna (藤原有綱の娘)
 Son: Minamoto no Yoshichika (? - 1108)
 4th Son: Minamoto no Yoshikuni (源義国, 1082–1155)

Family tree

See also 

 Seiwa Genji
 Minamoto no Yoritomo, the first shōgun of the Kamakura shogunate.
 Ashikaga Takauji, the first shōgun of the Ashikaga shogunate.
 Minamoto no Yorinobu

References

External links
Minamoto no Yoshiie at the Samurai-Archives.com

Minamoto clan
1039 births
1106 deaths
People of Heian-period Japan
Deified Japanese people